Adam Milstein (born 1952) is an Israeli-American real estate investor, lobbyist and philanthropist. He is a managing partner of Hager Pacific Properties.

In 2000, Milstein and his wife Gila founded the Adam and Gila Milstein Family Foundation. He is a co-founder of the Israeli-American Council, where he currently serves as chairman of the board. Both organizations support Israeli-American and Jewish-American identity and support of Israel.

Early life 
Milstein was born in Haifa, Israel, the eldest child of Eva (née Temkin), a homemaker, and Hillel Milstein, a real estate developer.

In 1971, Milstein was conscripted into the Israel Defense Forces and served during the 1973 Yom Kippur War. Afterwards he enrolled in the Technion, where he graduated in 1978 with a Bachelor of Science degree in business and economics. While in college, he worked with his father to expand their real estate construction and development business.

In 1974, Milstein married Gila Elgrably in Haifa. In 1981, the family moved to the United States. In 1983, Milstein received an MBA from the University of Southern California. He started working in commercial real estate as a sales agent.

Personal life 
Milstein and his wife Gila live in Encino, California. They have three daughters and three grandchildren.

In 2009 Milstein pleaded guilty to tax evasion involving his donations to  the Spinka Hasidic sect. Milstein served three months in prison, 600 hours of community service, and paid a  $30,000 fine.

Career 
Milstein is a managing partner of Hager Pacific Properties, overseeing the firm's financing, disposition and accounting. The firm specializes in acquiring, rehabilitating and repositioning industrial, retail, office and multi-family properties. In 2009 he was convicted of tax fraud.

Activism 
In 2000, Milstein and his wife Gila founded the Adam and Gila Milstein Family Foundation (MFF). The organization sponsors education of students and young professionals to identify with their Jewish roots, and gain knowledge to advocate for the State of Israel and the Jewish people.

Milstein is a co-founder of the Israeli-American Council. In 2015, he was named chairman of the group.

Milstein also sits on the boards of StandWithUs, Israel on Campus Coalition, Hasbara Fellowships, Jewish Funders Network, Birthright Israel, Stand By Me, and the American Israel Public Affairs Committee (AIPAC) National Council. However, in 2019, Milstein withdrew from that year's AIPAC conference, amidst controversy over remarks he made on Twitter questioning the loyalty to America of two Muslim Democrat lawmakers.

Milstein and his wife Gila are co-founders of Sifriyat Pijama B'America, which provides free monthly books in Hebrew to more than 70 Israeli-Jewish American families in the United States. In 2016, they started "The Donor Forum," an initiative to connect pro-Israel donors with pro-Israel causes.

In June 2015, Milstein joined with Sheldon Adelson and Haim Saban to organize the inaugural Campus Maccabees summit. The event brought together more than 50 organizations to collaborate against anti-Semitic groups or activities on college campuses in the United States. Milstein strongly opposes the Boycott, Divestment and Sanctions (BDS) Movement, and has had several op-ed pieces published on this subject.

In 2016, The Jerusalem Post selected Milstein for its list of the world's 50 most influential Jews. In 2015 and 2016, Algemeiner Journal named Milstein to its list, "The Top 100 People Positively Influencing Jewish Life, 2015."

Gil Troy identifies Milstein as a contemporary leader of cultural Zionism in his book The Zionist Ideas; Visions for the Jewish Homeland — Then, Now, Tomorrow (2018). The section on Milstein presents his "vision of Israeliness to invigorate Zionism and Jewish identity—in Israel and abroad."

References

External links

Living people
1952 births
Technion – Israel Institute of Technology alumni
Marshall School of Business alumni
Israeli emigrants to the United States
Businesspeople from Los Angeles
American real estate businesspeople
Israeli philanthropists
American philanthropists
American Zionists
People from Haifa
People from Encino, Los Angeles
American people convicted of tax crimes
American lobbyists